Cipollino may refer to:

Arts and entertainment
 Cipollino, a fictional character from Gianni Rodari's Tale of Cipollino
 Chipollino (film) (also released as Cipollino), a 1961 film adaptaion of the Tale of Cipollino; see List of animated feature films of the 1960s 
 Cipollino, a 1973 ballet by Karen Khachaturian

Other uses
 Cipollino marble, a type of marble popular in antiquity for Greeks and Romans

See also

 
 Chipolin (disambiguation)
 Cipollina (disambiguation)
 Cipollini (disambiguation)
 Cipollone
 Cipolla (disambiguation)